Visionseeker: Shared Wisdom from the Place of Refuge is the third book in the Spiritwalker trilogy written by Hank Wesselman.  The trilogy details a series of out-of-body experiences to a tribal society 5000 years in the future.

See also  
 List of works by Hank Wesselman

2002 non-fiction books
Neoshamanism books